The military doctrine of the Russia is a strategic planning document of the Russia and represents a system of officially state adopted views of preparation for the armed protection of Russia. The most recent revision of the military doctrine was approved in 2021.

Numerous successive revisions of military doctrine have been promulgated since 1990. These have included the military doctrines of May 1992 (in draft form), November 1993, and January 2000, as well as the two National Security Concepts of December 1997 and October 1999. Military doctrine in the Russian sense, however, extends beyond discussion of potential threats. In Christopher Donnelly's words, it forms part of "a set of views, accepted in a country at a given time, which cover the aims and character of possible war, the preparations of the country and its armed forces for such war, and the methods of waging it."

1992 draft 
The 1992 draft doctrine showed that first Russian thoughts on external threats were little more than a replica of Soviet thinking. The document stated that while the threat of a world war had declined significantly, the 'sources of military danger' in international relations remained the same as under the USSR.

The first of those "sources of military danger" was given as:
"the eagerness of single States or coalitions of states to dominate in the world community or in individual regions, and their predilection for settling matters in dispute by military means".

There could be little doubt that the General Staff, who produced the paper, had the United States and NATO in mind when they wrote this. As slightly further down, it was stated that Russia did not regard any state or coalition as an enemy, a contraction had been introduced between the old and the new, evolving security environment. 'Powerful groupings of armed forces' near Russia's borders, the military build-up of 'certain states', international terrorism, and the proliferation of weapons of mass destruction were also mentioned. Russia also subtlety rescinded its nuclear no first use commitment by indicating that conventional attacks on nuclear weapons, power plants, 'and other potentially dangerous facilities' (presumably chemical or biological sites) would be regarded as the first use of weapons of mass destruction.

1993 Military Doctrine
The Supreme Soviet of the Russian SFSR (as it was then) refused to approve the 1992 draft. A new military doctrine only entered into force in November 1993, and was not made fully public; the summary released covered 21 of the 23 pages of the document.
No reason was given for the only-partial release of the text, and this gave rise to fears that the Russian Government and/or its military wished to conceal controversial or discreditable intentions.

The summary released showed major differences from the external threats thinking of the 1992 draft. Two main threads showed
through the list. Firstly was the remaining threat from the West, exemplified by worries over expansion of military blocs and violation of arms accords, as well as with interference with Russians abroad. The no-first-use commitment of nuclear weapons was dropped. Secondly, newer dangers were acknowledged; nearby internal wars, the proliferation of weapons of mass destruction, and
terrorism.

In keeping with its emphasis on the threat of regional conflicts, the doctrine called for Russian armed forces that were smaller, lighter, and more mobile, with a higher degree of professionalism and with greater rapid deployment capability. Such change proved extremely difficult to achieve.

2000 Military Doctrine
Both in the 1992 draft and in the 1993 official document, a distinction had been drawn between sources of external military danger and immediate military threats. This distinction disappeared in the most recent doctrinal statement, which was first publicised in draft form in October 1999, and then finally approved by Presidential decree in late April 2000.

While numerous changes were made to the document between its draft stage and final form, the section on external military threats remained virtually the same. The first threat is seen as territorial claims upon the Russian Federation and interference in Russian domestic affairs, language drawn directly from the 1993 external dangers section. Secondly mentioned was disregard for Russian concerns in international conflict resolution, and opposition to strengthening Russia as one centre of a multipolar world. The multipolarity reference echos deleted sections from the 1999 draft, where two contradictory tendencies were set out: at one end, a trend toward a unipolar world based on the domination of one superpower - clearly the United States - and the military resolution of key problems, and at the other, a tendency toward the formation of a multipolar world, based on the rule of international law and the equal rights of people and nations.

Certain changes were made in light of the Chechen wars and the Kosovo war.

2010 Military Doctrine

Russia's 2010 military doctrine defines itself as strictly defensive. An English-language translation of the Russian text was available as of November 2022 at the Carnegie Endowment for International Peace website.

The doctrine lists 11 actions seen as constituting "external dangers" (dangers) to the Russian Federation which include:
 striving to give NATO forces global functions, moving NATO infrastructure closer to Russia's borders
 attempt to destabilize the situation in various states and regions and undermine strategic stability
 deployment of foreign military contingents in countries and waters adjacent to Russia and its allies
 deployment of strategic anti-missile defense systems, undermining global stability, and violating the established nuclear balance of forces, the militarization of space, and deployment of non-nuclear precision weapons;
 territorial claims against Russia and its allies and interference in internal affairs
 spread of weapons of mass destruction, missiles and missile technology, increase in the number of nuclear states
 violation by some states of international agreements and non-compliance with previously concluded arms limitation and reduction treaties
 use of military force in adjacent states in violation of the UN Charter and other international legal norms
 presence of sources and escalation of military conflict in territories adjacent to Russia and its allies
 spread of international terrorism
 occurrence of sources of inter-ethnic (inter-faith) tensions, activity of international armed radical groups in areas adjacent to Russia and its allies, growth of separatism and forcible extremism in various regions of the world

It also lists five actions seen as constituting military threats:
 a sharpening of the military-political situation and creation of conditions for the use of military force
 hindrance of the working of the state and military command and control system, interference in the functioning of its strategic nuclear forces, missile attack warning systems, space monitoring systems, nuclear warhead storage facilities, nuclear power and other potentially dangerous facilities
 creation and training of illegal armed formations and their activity on Russian territory or that of its allies
 demonstration of force in the course of conducting exercises in states adjacent to Russia or its allies with provocative intent
 activation of military forces in various states with the conduct of partial or full mobilization and transition to wartime footing

Under the new doctrine, Russia continues to develop and modernize its nuclear capability. "Russia reserves the right to use nuclear weapons in response to the use of nuclear and other types of weapons of mass destruction against it or its allies, and also in case of aggression against Russia with the use of conventional weapons when the very existence of the state is threatened." Most military analysts believe that, in this case, Russia would pursue an 'escalate to de-escalate’ strategy, initiating limited nuclear exchange to bring adversaries to the negotiating table. Russia will also threaten nuclear conflict to discourage initial escalation of any major conventional conflict.

2014 Military Doctrine

The next revision of the military doctrine was issued on 26 December 2014. A useful English-language translation was available on a Russian government website as recently as November 2022.

A list of scenarios under which Russia would be motivated to act militarily towards other countries is included. The doctrine lists a variety of military actions, including the “implementation of the global strike concept” and the “intention to place weapons in outer space.” It also states one of the main tasks of the Russian military is to “resist attempts by some states or group of states to achieve military superiority through the deployment of strategic missile defense systems, the placement of weapons in outer space or the deployment of strategic non-nuclear high-precision weapon systems.” Evidence indicates that Russia is actively developing and testing an array of space weapons.

In the words of one Polish observer, "State policy and military doctrine are inextricably linked because the competent military policy meets all changes in international and domestic situations and successive military reforms are impossible without corresponding reflection in Military Doctrine."

Subsidiary doctrine
Since the re-issuance of the 2014 document, the Russian government has published the 2015 National Security Strategy, the 2016 Foreign Policy Concept, the 2017 Naval Strategy, and the 2020 Principles of Nuclear Deterrence Strategy, as well as the 2016 Information Security Doctrine.

Putin updated the National Security Strategy on 02 July 2021. This document calls to develop a comprehensive partnership with China and a special strategic partnership with India, so as to ensure stability and security in the Asia-Pacific region.

See also
 Gerasimov doctrine
 New physical principles weapons
 Military history of the Soviet Union

Notes

References

External links
 Military doctrine of the Russian Federation text (Russian)
 Military doctrine of the Russian Federation - English translation
 Conflict Studies Research Centre, Document listings on Russia, includes several reports on Russian military doctrine

Military of Russia
Military doctrines